Melaleuca huttensis is a plant in the myrtle family Myrtaceae, and is endemic to the south-west of Western Australia. It is a small, woody shrub with elliptic leaves, mostly crowded near the ends of the branches which are tipped with heads of white or yellow flowes during spring and early summer. It is a threatened species, potentially endangered by the construction of the Oakajee Port near Geraldton.

Description

The flowers are white to a shade of yellow and fade to pink. They are arranged in heads on the ends of branches which continue to grow after flowering. There are five bundles of stamens around the flower, each with 10 to 12 stamens.

Taxonomy and naming
Melaleuca huttensis was first formally described in 1999 by Lyndley Craven in Australian Systematic Botany from a specimen collected on the road to Coronation Beach near Geraldton. The specific epithet (huttensis) is derived from the name of the hearby Hutt River.

Distribution and habitat
This melaleuca occurs in the Hutt River district in the Geraldton Sandplains biogeographic region where it grows in heath on sandplains.

Conservation status
Melaleuca huttensis is listed as "Priority One" by the Government of Western Australia Department of Parks and Wildlife meaning that it is known from a few locations which are potentially at risk and all occurrences are on lands not managed for conservation.  A targeted flora survey was undertaken for the Oakajee Rail and Port development, although the development has so far not proceeded.

References

huttensis
Plants described in 1999
Endemic flora of Western Australia
Taxa named by Lyndley Craven